HMS Terrible was a 74-gun third rate ship of the line of the Royal Navy, built by John Barnard and launched on 4 September 1762 at King's Yard in Harwich, as a sister ship to HMS Arrogant.

In the English Channel, in 1777, under Captain Richard Bickerton, she took an American privateer brig called the Rising States, Capt Thompson.

In 1778 she fought at the First Battle of Ushant, and in 1781 Terrible (Capt. Finch) was part of Sir Thomas Graves' fleet at the Battle of the Chesapeake. During the course of the battle, she took heavy damage, and was scuttled, or deliberately sunk, after the battle had ended.

Notable Commanders

Mariot Arbuthnot 1770 to 1773
Sir Richard Bickerton, 1st Baronet 1776 to 1779
John Leigh Douglas 1779 to 1780
John Thomas Duckworth 1780 to 1781
Henry Edwyn Stanhope 1781

Notes

References

Lavery, Brian (2003) The Ship of the Line – Volume 1: The development of the battlefleet 1650–1850. Conway Maritime Press. .

Ships of the line of the Royal Navy
Ramillies-class ships of the line
1762 ships
Ships built in Harwich
Shipwrecks in the Chesapeake Bay
Maritime incidents in 1781